In mathematics, Brewer sums are finite character sum introduced by  related to Jacobsthal sums.

Definition

The Brewer sum is given by

where Dn is the Dickson polynomial (or "Brewer polynomial") given by 

and is the Legendre symbol.

The Brewer sum is zero when n is coprime to q2−1.

References

Number theory